Blur, formerly DoNotTrackMe (DNTMe), is a browser extension for blocking trackers on the Internet developed by Abine, a privacy company headquartered in Boston, Massachusetts, and first released for Firefox in March 2011. There is a free and a paid version with more features.

DoNotTrackMe was available for the Mozilla Firefox, Google Chrome, Safari, and Internet Explorer browsers. In October 2013, Abine reported that they could not develop DNTMe for smartphones and tablets due to technology limitations, but were working on other mobile products. Version v34.3.1263 was current as of October 2014.

The add-on was designed to stop what Abine claims is over 600 companies from tracking users across the Internet. DoNotTrackMe stops these companies by blocking Internet tracking activity, which Abine defines as "a request that a webpage tries to make your browser perform that will share information intended to record, profile, or share your online activity." These trackers are put in place by companies like Facebook and Google Analytics to track Internet users, and tracking provides benefits for the companies, such as better tailoring of advertisements to users.

Articles on DoNotTrackMe were published in PC Magazine, Forbes, The Wall Street Journal, and CNN.  the company claimed 1,500,000 downloads.

An associated add-on, MaskMe, provided delete, masked email addresses without charge, and masked telephone numbers and credit cards for a subscription charge. These masked contact details enable an organization to contact a user by redirecting communications, without revealing the actual destination. 

In November 2014, Abine announced Blur as a replacement for their DoNotTrackMe and MaskMe services, with both free and paid options.

See also
 uBlock Origin
 Disconnect Mobile  An open source application developed by Brian Kennish and Casey Oppenheim designed to stop non-consensual third party trackers.
 Ghostery  A privacy and security-related browser extension and mobile application owned by Ghostery, Inc.
 Privacy Badger – A free browser extension created by the EFF that blocks advertisements and tracking cookies.

References

Free Firefox WebExtensions
Google Chrome extensions
Internet Explorer add-ons
2011 software
Internet privacy software